The 4th Asian Film Awards was given in a ceremony on 22 March 2010 as part of the Hong Kong International Film Festival.

Nominees and winners

Best Film
Winner: Mother (South Korea)
City of Life and Death (China)
Lola (Philippines)
Parade (Japan)
No Puedo Vivir Sin Ti (Taiwan)
Bodyguards and Assassins (Hong Kong)

Best Director
Winner: Lu Chuan, City of Life and Death (China)
Brillante Mendoza, Lola (Philippines)
Yonfan, Prince of Tears (Hong Kong/Taiwan)
Sono Sion, Love Exposure (Japan)
Bong Joon-ho, Mother (South Korea)
Asghar Farhadi, About Elly (Iran)

Best Actor
Winner: Wang Xueqi, Bodyguards and Assassins (Hong Kong)
Asano Tadanobu, Villon's Wife (Japan)
Huang Bo, Cow (China)
Song Kang-ho, Thirst (South Korea)
Matsumoto Hitoshi, Symbol (Japan)

Best Actress
Winner: Kim Hye-ja, Mother (South Korea)
Li Bingbing, The Message (China)
Bae Doona, Air Doll (Japan)
Sandrine Pinna, Yang Yang (Taiwan)
Matsu Takako, Villon's Wife (Japan)

Best Newcomer
Winner: Ng Meng Hui, At the End of Daybreak (Malaysia/Hong Kong/South Korea)
Zhu Xuan, Prince of Tears (Taiwan/Hong Kong)
Li Yuchun, Bodyguards and Assassins (Hong Kong)
Kim Sae-ron, A Brand New Life (South Korea)
Sonam Kapoor, Delhi 6 (India)

Best Supporting Actor
Winner: Nicholas Tse, Bodyguards and Assassins (Hong Kong)
Eita, Dear Doctor (Japan)
Huang Xiaoming, The Message (China)
Won Bin, Mother (South Korea)
Tou Chung-hua, The Warrior and the Wolf (China)

Best Supporting Actress
Winner: Kara Hui, At the End of Daybreak (Malaysia/Hong Kong/South Korea)
Yan Ni, Cow (China)
Kim Kkot-bi,  Breathless (South Korea)
Ryōko Hirosue, Villon's Wife (Japan)
Sakura Ando, A Crowd of Three (Japan)

Best Screenwriter
Winner: Bong Joon-ho and Park Eun-kyo, Mother (South Korea)
Hong Sang-soo, Like You Know It All (South Korea)
, Adrift (Vietnam)
Wai Ka-fai and Au Kin-yee, Written By (Hong Kong)
Asghar Farhadi, About Elly (Iran)

Best Cinematographer
Winner: Cao Yu, City of Life and Death (China)
Cheng Siu-keung, Vengeance (Hong Kong)
Chung Chung-hoon, Thirst (South Korea)
Ly Thai Dung, Adrift (Vietnam)
Jake Pollock, Yang Yang (Taiwan)

Best Production Designer
Winner: Alain-Pascal Housiaux and Patrick Deche, Face (Taiwan)
Kenneth Mak, Bodyguards and Assassins (Hong Kong)
Hayashida Yuji, Yatterman (Japan)
Xiao Haihang, The Message (China)
Ryu Seong-hie, Thirst (South Korea)

Best Composer
Winner: Lo Ta-Yu, Vengeance (Hong Kong)
Jang Young-gyu and Lee Byung-hoon, Running Turtle (South Korea)
Liu Tong, City of Life and Death (China)
Saito Kazuyoshi, Fish Story (film) (Japan)
Hoang Ngoc Dai, Adrift (Vietnam)

Best Editor
Winner: Lee Chatametikool, Karaoke (Malaysia)
Kong Chi-leung and Chan Chi-wai, Overhead (Hong Kong)
Moon Sae-kyung, Mother (South Korea)
Kats Serraon, Lola (Philippines)
Tang Hua, Zhang Yifan and Du Yuan, Crazy Racer (China)

Best Visual Effects
Winner: Yi Zeonhyoung, Thirst (South Korea)
Wang Jianxiong, Jimmy Chen and Li Liping, Crazy Racer (China)
Seshita Hiroyuki, Symbol (Japan)
Fujita Takuya and Nozaki Koji, Goemon (Japan)
Ng Yuen-fai, Tam Kai-kwan and Chas Chau Chi-shing, The Storm Warriors (Hong Kong)

Best Costume Designer
Winner: Christian Lacroix, Anne Dunsford and Wang Chia-Hui, Face (Taiwan)
Dora Ng, Bodyguards and Assassins (Hong Kong)
Shim Hyun-soeb, The Sword with No Name (South Korea)
Tina Kalivas and Vaughan Alexander, Goemon (Japan)
Wada Emi, The Warrior and the Wolf (China)

Special awards
Lifetime Achievement Award: Amitabh Bachchan (India)
Asian Film Award for Outstanding Contribution to Asian Cinema: Zhang Yimou (China)
The Asian Film Awards for 2009’s Top-Grossing Film Director: John Woo, Red Cliff Part II (China)

External links

2010 Asian Film Awards

Asian Film Awards ceremonies
2010 film awards
2010 in Hong Kong
Film
Hong Kong